This is a list of years in Venezuela. See also the timeline of Venezuelan history.  For only articles about years in Venezuela that have been written, see :Category:Years in Venezuela.

Twenty-first century

Twentieth century

Nineteenth century

Eighteenth century

See also 
 Timeline of Caracas
 List of years by country

Years in Venezuela
Venezuela history-related lists
History of Venezuela